Grantly Hills is a residential community in York County, Pennsylvania, United States and is a suburb of York. It is part of the Grantley census-designated place. Grantly Hills is located in Spring Garden Township off Country Club Road adjacent to Wyndham Hills.

References

Unincorporated communities in Pennsylvania